Cassia moschata, the bronze shower, is a species of flowering plant in the family Fabaceae. It is found from southern Mexico to northern Brazil, and it has been introduced to Sri Lanka. It is used as a street tree in a number of cities in Panama.

References

moschata
Flora of Southwestern Mexico
Flora of Southeastern Mexico
Flora of Veracruz
Flora of Central America
Flora of Trinidad and Tobago
Flora of Colombia
Flora of Venezuela
Flora of Guyana
Flora of West-Central Brazil
Flora of North Brazil
Plants described in 1824